Dashalty or Karin Tak is a village in the Shusha District of Azerbaijan, in the disputed region of Nagorno-Karabakh. The village had an ethnic Armenian-majority population prior to the 2020 Nagorno-Karabakh war, and also had an Armenian majority in 1989.

About 3 km downriver there is a mossy waterfall named "Zontik" (literally, "Umbrella"), because of its resemblance to an umbrella in the rain. The village is an overnight stopping point along the Janapar hiking trail.

Etymology 
Both the Azerbaijani and Armenian names of the village mean "below the rock", referring to the sheer vertical cliffs towering above the village, on top of which Shusha is built.

History 
During the Soviet period, the village was part of the Shusha District of the Nagorno-Karabakh Autonomous Oblast. After the First Nagorno-Karabakh War, the village was administrated as part of the Shushi Province of the breakaway Republic of Artsakh. Shusha, located just above the village, was the last Azerbaijani stronghold in Nagorno-Karabakh to be captured by Armenian forces in the First Nagorno-Karabakh War. On January 26, 1992 Azerbaijani Defense Minister Mehdiyev "led a disastrous sortie out of Shusha to capture the Armenian village of Karintak", in which dozens of Azerbaijani soldiers died.

On 9 November 2020, the last day of the 2020 Nagorno-Karabakh war, Azerbaijani troops captured the village, and after that, the city of Shusha itself.

The village monument dedicated to the fallen in World War II was destroyed by Azerbaijani forces after the 2020 Nagorno-Karabakh war.

Historical heritage sites 
Historical heritage sites in and around the village include a 13th-century khachkar, an 18th/19th-century cemetery, an 18th/19th-century bridge, a 19th-century watermill, and the church of Surb Astvatsatsin built in 1862.

The old town square is relatively well preserved, showing some traditional pre-Soviet architecture of the region. There is also a plain village church that was restored by Land and Culture Organization volunteers in 1999–2000.  It was originally built in 1816 in the place of a previously existing chapel.

Demographics 
The village had 588 inhabitants in 2005, and 660 inhabitants in 2015.

Gallery

References

External links 

 
 Population statistics (2005)

Populated places in Shushi Province
Populated places in Shusha District